Huanan Bridge is a bridge crossing the Pearl River in Guangzhou, China.

The bridge carries the Huanan Expressway, which connects the Haizhu District and southern Panyu District with the Tianhe District. It also serves as an important connection between the grounds of the biannual Canton Fair in Pazhou and the new central business district of Zhujiang New Town.

References

Bridges in Guangzhou
Bridges over the Pearl River (China)